Choi Hyun-ja (born 16 February 1959) is a South Korean retired para table tennis player. She won a silver medal at the 2012 Summer Paralympics at age 53.

Her disability was caused by an accident when she was around ten years old. She began playing in 1992, and was the first female para table tennis player in South Korea.

References 

1959 births
Paralympic medalists in table tennis
South Korean female table tennis players
Table tennis players at the 2008 Summer Paralympics
Table tennis players at the 2012 Summer Paralympics
Medalists at the 2012 Summer Paralympics
Paralympic table tennis players of South Korea
Living people
Paralympic silver medalists for South Korea
People with paraplegia
FESPIC Games competitors
21st-century South Korean women